The women's madison competition at the 2021 UEC European Track Championships was held on 9 October 2021.

Results
120 laps (30 km) were raced with 12 sprints.

References

Women's madison
European Track Championships – Women's madison